Colonel Yury Mikalevich Zakharanka (1 January 1952 – disappeared 9 May 1999) was a Belarusian military officer, politician, and pro-democracy activist who served as Minister of Internal Affairs from 1994 to 1995. Following his departure from office, Zakharanka became a leading member of the Belarusian opposition, leading to his enforced disappearance and likely death in 1999.

Early life
Yury Zakharanka was born in a small town of Vasilyevichy, Rechytsa Raion.

Political career
At the moment when Belarus gained independence Zakharanka was deputy chief of the USSR MVD Inter-regional Directorate for Combating Organized Crime. In 1994 he was appointed Minister of Internal Affairs of Belarus. On October 16, 1995 he was dismissed from this position by president Alexander Lukashenko. Zakharanka joined the opposition to the president and was elected member of the governing board of the United Civic Party of Belarus. Having strong support among top officers in the army and the State Security Committee (KGB), Zakharanka was a dangerous enemy for Lukashenko.

Abduction
The ex-minister disappeared on the evening of May 7, 1999. The state did not make serious attempts to search for the politician. Several years later the former MVD official Aleh Alkaeu fled to Germany and stated that he was witness to Zakharanka and several other abducted opposition leaders being murdered on the orders of top government officials. In commemoration of the abducted politicians and political prisoners of Belarus, the Belarusian opposition and its supporters have The Day of Solidarity with Belarus on the 16th of every month.

In September 2004, the European Union and the United States issued travel bans for five Belarusian officials suspected of being involved in the kidnapping of Zakharanka: Interior Affairs Minister Vladimir Naumov, Prosecutor General Viktor Sheiman, Minister for Sports and Tourism Yuri Sivakov, and Colonel Dmitry Pavlichenko from the Belarus Interior Ministry.

In December 2019, Deutsche Welle published a documentary film in which Yury Harauski, a former member of a special unit of the Belarusian Ministry of Internal Affairs, confirmed that it was his unit that had arrested, taken away and murdered Zakharanka, and that they later did the same with Viktar Hanchar and Anatol Krasouski.

See also
List of people who disappeared

References

External links
 Where are Belarus' disappeared oppositionists? on hri.org
 Zakharanka case on Charter97.org
 Oleg Alkaev: Video Records of Zakharenko, Gonchar and Krasovsky’s Murders Exist Indeed
 Orders to Annihilate Zakharenko, Gonchar and Krasovsky Emanated from Sheiman and Sivakov
 Solidarity with Belarus

1952 births
1990s missing person cases
Belarusian generals
Interior ministers of Belarus
Missing people
Missing person cases in Belarus
People from Rechytsa District
United Civic Party of Belarus politicians
Year of death unknown